Bridget R. Scanlon (born 1959) is an Irish and American hydrogeologist known for her work on groundwater depletion and groundwater recharging, and of the effects of climate change and land usage patterns on groundwater.  She is a senior research scientist in the Bureau of Economic Geology at the University of Texas at Austin, where she is head of the Sustainable Water Resources Program. Her research has included the use of GRACE satellite data to compare drought conditions in Texas and California.

Education and career
Scanlon is originally from County Kerry in Ireland. She earned a bachelor's degree in geology at Trinity College Dublin in 1980, and worked with the Geological Survey of Ireland before moving to the US for graduate study.

She earned a master's degree at the University of Alabama in 1983, with a master's thesis based on her field work in the basin of the River Maine in Ireland, and completed a Ph.D. at the University of Kentucky in 1985, studying the karst landscape of the inner Bluegrass region of Kentucky.

After briefly working at a consulting firm, she joined the Bureau of Economic Geology at the University of Texas at Austin in 1987. Since 2004 she has also held an adjunct faculty position at the University of Nebraska.

Recognition
Scanlon became a Fellow of the Geological Society of America in 2005, and a Fellow of the American Geophysical Union in 2015. She was elected a member of the National Academy of Engineering in 2016 "for contributions to the evaluation of groundwater recharge and aquifer depletion".

Scanlon was the 2007 Birdsall–Dreiss Distinguished Lecturer of the Geological Society of America, which also gave her their 2019 O. E. Meinzer Award. The National Ground Water Association gave Scanlon their 2016 M. King Hubbert Award. The International Association of Hydrogeologists gave her their 2018 Presidents’ Award.

The University of Texas gave Scanlon the William L. Fisher Endowed Chair in Geological Sciences for 2016–2018.

Selected publications
Scanlon's Meinzer Award citation selected the following four papers of Scanlon for particular attention, noting their high citations. It stated that the first two made Scanlon "the leading global expert on groundwater recharge", while the second two demonstrated her more recent interest in climate change and sustainability, and included pioneering work in the water resources used by hydraulic fracturing:

References

External links
Home page

1959 births
Living people
People from County Kerry
Irish emigrants to the United States
Hydrogeologists
20th-century American geologists
21st-century American geologists
American women geologists
American hydrologists
Women hydrologists
20th-century Irish geologists
Irish women geologists
Alumni of Trinity College Dublin
University of Alabama alumni
University of Kentucky alumni
Fellows of the American Geophysical Union
Fellows of the Geological Society of America
Members of the United States National Academy of Engineering
20th-century American women scientists
21st-century American women scientists